Pollenia haeretica is a species of cluster fly in the family Polleniidae.

Distribution
Algeria, Tunisia, Italy.

References

Polleniidae
Insects described in 1928
Diptera of Europe
Diptera of Africa